Hallelujah is an interjection used as an expression of gratitude to God.

Hallelujah or the variation Alleluia, may also refer to:

 Alleluia, a Latin phrase in Christianity used to give praise to God

Film, television and theatre
 Hallelujah (1929), directed by King Vidor
 Hallelujah! (TV series), a British sitcom 1983–1984
 Hallelujah (TV film), a 2011 TV film directed by Michael Apted
 Alleluia (2014 film), a French horror film
 Alleluia! The Devil's Carnival, a 2015 film 
 Hallelooya, a 2016 Malayalam film
 Allelujah!, a 2018 play by Alan Bennett
 Allelujah (film), an adaptation of Bennett's play that began production in 2021

Music

Classical music
Arranged in chronological order of apparition of the original piece.
Alleluja, composition by Dieterich Buxtehude
Alleluia, composition by Mikołaj z Radomia
"Hallelujah", also known as "Hallelujah Chorus", the chorus from Handel's Messiah Part II
Hallelujah, composition  by Antonio Rosetti (c. 1750–92)
Hallelujah, composition by Giacomo Meyerbeer (1791–1864)
Halleluja, Op. 70 No. 6, by Marco Enrico Bossi (1861–1925)
"Alleluia (Thompson)", a choral piece by Randall Thompson
Alleluia, composition by Ned Rorem
Alleluia, composition by Eric Whitacre
Alleluia, composition by Valentin Silvestrov
Alleluja, composition by James MacMillan
Alleluia, composition by Paweł Łukaszewski

Albums
 Hallelujah (album), a 1969 album by Canned Heat
 Hallelujah (EP), a 1989 EP by the Happy Mondays
 Alleluia, a 1992 album by Vocal Majority
 Hallelujah, a 2010 album by Will Blunderfield
 Aleluia, a 2010 album by Diante do Trono
 Hallelujah! (Mormon Tabernacle Choir album), a 2016 album by the Mormon Tabernacle Choir

Popular songs
 "Hallelujah!", a 1927 song written by Vincent Youmans, Leo Robin and Clifford Grey for the mus Hit the Deck (musical)
 "Hallelujah!" (gospel song), a 1992 soul reinterpretation of Handel by Mervyn Warren
 "Hallelujah" (Deep Purple song), a 1969 song written by Roger Greenaway and Roger Cook
 "Halleluhwah", a song from Can's 1971 album Tago Mago
 "Hallelujah" (Milk and Honey song), the winning entry in the 1979 Eurovision Song Contest
 "Hallelujah" (Leonard Cohen song), originally performed by Cohen in 1984
 "Hallelujah", a song from Prefab Sprout's 1985 album Steve McQueen
 "Hallelujah!" (Holly Johnson song), 1999
 "Hallelujah", a song from Nick Cave and the Bad Seeds 2001 album, No More Shall We Part 
 "Hallelujah", a song from the 2001 album Mutter, by Rammstein
 "Hallelujah", a song by Gin Wigmore, the winning entrant in the 2004 International Songwriting Competition
 "Hallelujah" (ThisGirl song), 2004
 "Hallelujah, a song by the band Bamboo, 2005
 "Hallelujah" (Krystal Meyers song), 2006
 "Hallelujah" (Paramore song), 2007
 "Hallelujah", a 2012 song by Chief Keef on Finally Rich
 "Hallelujah", a 2012 song by Reks on REBELutionary
 "Alleluia", a 2013 song by japanese band Kalafina
"Hallelujah", a 2013 song by Monster Magnet from the 2013 album Last Patrol
 "Hallelujah" (Panic! at the Disco song), 2015
"Hallelujah", 2016 song by Pentatonix
 "Hallelujah", a 2016 song by Alicia Keys from the album Here
 "Hallelujah", a song from Logic's 2017 album, Everybody
 "Hallelujah", a 2018 song by Bill Wurtz
"Hallelujah", a 2019 song by Haim
 "Hallelujah" (Carrie Underwood song), a 2020 Christmas song co-performed with John Legend
 "Hallelujah", a song by Underoath from their 2021 album Voyeurist

Fictional entities
 Allelujah Haptism, or Hallelujah, a character in the anime series Mobile Suit Gundam 00
 Hallelujah Mountains, on the moon Pandora, in the 2009 film Avatar

Other uses
 Hallelujah FC, a South Korean football club
 Avatar Hallelujah Mountain, in the Zhangjiajie National Forest Park in China
 Oxalis acetosella, or wood sorrel, known as Alleluia, a flowering plant
 Ulmus parvifolia 'Hallelujah', a Chinese elm cultivar

See also
 
 
 Hellelujah, a 2016 album by American band Drowning Pool